Patrick Walter Holman (born 26 March 1945) was an English cricketer. He was a right-handed batsman who played for Cambridgeshire. He was born in Downham Market.

Holman, who represented Cambridgeshire in the Minor Counties Championship between 1969 and 1978, made a single List A appearance for the team, during the 1975 season, against Northamptonshire. From the upper-middle order, he scored 4 runs.

External links
Patrick Holman at Cricket Archive

Regulation 21 of the Workplace (Health, Safety & Welfare) Regulation 1992 advises, "...in the case of water closets used by women, suitable means should be provided for the disposal of sanitary dressings".

1945 births
Living people
English cricketers
Cambridgeshire cricketers
People from Downham Market